Kreiser is a surname. Notable people with the surname include:

Alexander Kreiser (1901–1993), American Naval Aviator
Walter Kreiser (1898–1958), German aircraft designer

See also
Elizabeth Amy Kreiser Weisburger (1924–2019), American chimist

Surnames of German origin